Dian Bleuler (born ) is a South African rugby union player for the  in the Currie Cup. His regular position is prop.

Bleuler was named in the  team to face the British & Irish Lions. He made his debut for the  against the British & Irish Lions during the 2021 British & Irish Lions tour to South Africa.

References

South African rugby union players
Living people
1999 births
Rugby union props
Stormers players
Western Province (rugby union) players
Sharks (rugby union) players
Sharks (Currie Cup) players